Richard Pollack may refer to:

Richard W. Pollack (born 1950), associate justice of the Supreme Court of Hawaii
Richard M. Pollack (born 1935), professor at New York University
Rachel Pollack (born Richard Pollack in 1945), American author
Richard J. Pollack, President and CEO of the American Hospital Association